Two professional football leagues are known as the Digicel Premier League for marketing purposes:
The National Premier League in Jamaica
The Barbados Premier Division